Mixed Blessings is a British sitcom starring Christopher Blake and Muriel Odunton that aired on ITV from 3 March 1978 to 7 June 1980. It was created by comedy writer Sid Green and produced for the ITV network by LWT.

Premise and reception 
The show starred Christopher Blake (later of That's My Boy fame) and Muriel Odunton as newlyweds Thomas Simpson, who was white, and Susan Lambert, who was black. Most plots revolved around both families' disapproval of their inter-racial marriage.

According to a review on the BFI screenonline website, the series "was, superficially, more progressive" than earlier sitcoms centred on 'race' such as Curry and Chips (1969), Love Thy Neighbour (1972–76) and Mind Your Language (1977–79). While "the two main characters were sympathetically played... the series [itself] was critically undermined by presenting their relationship as a problem". The review also asserted: "While its set-up points to its integrationist intentions, one only has to look at the title to note the writer's own ambiguous feelings".

Cast 
Christopher Blake – Thomas Simpson
Muriel Odunton – Susan Lambert
George Waring – Edward Simpson
Sylvia Kay – Annie Simpson
Stefan Kalipha – William Lambert
Carmen Munroe – Matilda Lambert
Joan Sanderson – Aunt Dorothy
Gregory Munroe – Winston Lambert
Ernest Clark – Mr Huntley
Pauline Delaney – Mrs Beasley

Episodes

Series 1 (1978) 
 "Welcome To The Family" (3 March 1978)
 "Your Place Or Mine?" (10 March 1978)
 "You Haven't Got Much, Have You?" (17 March 1978)
 "Jobs For The Boys" (24 March 1978)
 "Happy Birthday, Dear Fathers" (31 March 1978)
 "We're Only Trying To Help" (7 April 1978)
 "The Housewarming" (14 April 1978)

Series 2 (1978) 
 "A Leg From The Past" (6 October 1978)
 "The Loneliness Of The Long Distance Unemployed" (13 October 1978)
 "My Chap's Got Work" (20 October 1978)
 "Thou Shalt Deny Me" (27 October 1978)
 "Your Money Or Your Life" (3 November 1978)
 "You're Going To Have A What!!" (10 November 1978)

Series 3 (1980) 
 "Raising The Roof" (26 October 1979)
 "Away From It All" (12 April 1980)
 "Up In The World" (19 April 1980)
 "The Anniversary Wars" (26 April 1980)
 "The Law And Mr Lambert" (3 May 1980)
 "Goodbye Charlie" (10 May 1980)
 "Your Turn For Grandad" (17 May 1980)
 "Practice Makes Perfect" (24 May 1980)
 "Survival" (31 May 1980)
 "Onto Us A Child" (7 June 1980)

Production of this series was interrupted after the recording of episode 1 by the ITV technicians' strike of 1979. The remaining nine episodes were recorded as soon as a studio became available, after higher-priority productions had been completed first. The first episode was transmitted two days after the strike ended, as schedules were very much ad hoc at this time as a result of such a long strike.

DVD release

References

1978 British television series debuts
1980 British television series endings
Black British sitcoms
ITV sitcoms
1970s British sitcoms
1980s British sitcoms
Television series by ITV Studios
London Weekend Television shows
English-language television shows